Dasho (Dzongkha: དྲག་ཤོས; Wylie: Drag-shos) (lit. Excellent One) is a Bhutanese honorific that is bestowed upon individuals, along with a red scarf kabney, by the Druk Gyalpo. In common practice, however, many senior government officials and social elites are incorrectly addressed as Dasho without officially receiving the title and the red scarf kabney.

Although the title is bestowed upon both men and women, men are more likely to be incorrectly addressed as Dasho. Dasho is also used for princes of the royal house, its female equivalent being Ashi.

See also
Ashi
Rinpoche

References

Honorifics